Marine mucilage, also referenced as sea snot or sea saliva, is thick, gelatinous organic matter found around the world's oceans, specifically in recent times in the Mediterranean Sea.  

Marine mucilage is composition is complex, as it can carry numerous microorganisms. The causes of marine mucilage range from increased phosphorus, drought conditions, and global warming. The effects of marine mucilage are also widespread, affecting fishing industries, smothering sea life, and spreading bacteria and viruses. Citizens and governments around the world are working to institute countermeasures, including treatment, seawater cleanup, and other public policy.

Composition 
Marine mucilage has many components, including a wide range of microorganisms including viruses and prokaryotes, and exopolymeric compounds with colloidal properties. While having multiple vague and inconsistent definitions throughout time, it is agreed that mucilages can form be a varied class of complex chemical substances, as well as complex natural materials. The composition of mucilage can change over time, and each different type of marine mucilage is not only defined by mucilage. Some components of marine mucilage are not mucilage molecules but rather microbes, debris, proteins, viruses, minerals, and more.

Causes 
The generation of marine mucilage is due to the large increase of phosphorus (phosphorus values were measured to be three to four times higher than previous year) and other excessive nutrients combined with drought conditions and with prolonged warm temperatures and calm weather. Marine mucilage is also produced by phytoplankton when they are stressed. 

Anthropogenic global climate change has generated a dramatic change in phytoplankton productivity.  Some overgrowth is partly due to climate change. Warmer, slower moving waters increase the production of marine mucilage and allow it to accumulate in massive blobs. From data taken from the Mediterranean Sea in the years 1950- present, it becomes evident that as temperature anomaly increases, the number of mucilage records grows as well.

Effects 
The significant increase in the amount of marine mucilage has become a public health, economic, and an environmental issue around the world. Excessive marine mucilage was observed clumping at least as early as 2009, while marine mucilage was first reported in 1729.

Public Health 
While marine mucilage is not known to be toxic to humans, there are still public health concerns that are associated with it. Due to its complex makeup, marine mucilage has been shown to contain pathogenic bacteria and transport marine diseases.  The majority of marine diseases spread by marine mucilage affect both marine invertebrates and vertebrates.

Economic 
Marine mucilage has had an evident impact on economies around the world, especially those that revolve around the Mediterranean Sea. Ever since its discovery, marine mucilage has long been seen as a nuisance to the fishing industry, as it clogs fishing nets. Tourism is also affected, as coastal towns that rely on tourism suffer from unpleasant looking waters. Properties of marine mucilage produce a bad smell and makes the seawater unsuitable for bathing.

Environmental 
Marine mucilage can also coat the gills of sea creatures subsumed in it, cutting off oxygen and killing them. Marine mucilage floating on the surface of the water also can significantly limit sunlight that reaches marine ecosystems.

Oil Spill 
The Deepwater Horizon oil spill in the Gulf of Mexico created large amounts of marine mucilage. Scientists are not sure how exactly the spill caused so much marine mucilage to form, but one theory asserts that the it could have been the result of a massive kill of microscopic marine life creating a "blizzard" of marine snow. Scientists worry that the mass of marine mucilage could pose a biohazard to surviving marine life in the area. It is widely believed that the marine mucilage left by the spill directly resulted in the loss of sea life in the Gulf of Mexico, as evidenced by a dead field of deepwater coral 11 kilometers from the Deepwater Horizon station.

Mediterranean Sea 

The Mediterranean Sea has observed the worse effects of marine mucilage, as the year 2021 experienced exponential growth as it reached a tipping point in the Mediterranean and other seas. In early 2021, marine mucilage spread in the Sea of Marmara, due to pollution from wastewater dumped into seawater, which led to the proliferation of phytoplankton, and posed a great threat to the marine biome. The port of Erdek at the Sea of Marmara was covered by the marine mucilage, in which Turkish workers embarked on a massive effort to vacuum up the slimy goop in June 2021. Yalıköy port in Ordu Province also witnessed accumulating mucilage in June 2021, in the Black Sea.

Countermeasures 
Short-term countermeasures include collecting marine mucilage from the sea surface and laying barriers on the sea surface. Long-term countermeasures include improving wastewater treatment, creating marine protected areas, and limiting climate change. Another effort could be developing such water bodies as tourist hubs so that waters do not remain stagnant for long which contributes for accumulation of sea snot. Another one could be introducing such marine species in the sea which could consume excessive nutrients, for cleaning purpose only and later keeping them in artificially developed habitats.

Current countermeasures to control and remove the presence of marine mucilage in specifically the Mediterranean Sea is seen in Turkish governmental policy, as Turkey has recently initiated the largest and most comprehensive sea cleaning mobilization to save the Marmara sea. Fines have been issued to companies that were discovered to be dumping waste from wastewater facilities into the sea.

See also

References 

Wikipedia Student Program
Adhesives
Effects of climate change